Maison Margiela, formerly Maison Martin Margiela, is a French luxury fashion house founded by Belgian designer Martin Margiela and  Jenny Meirens in 1988 and headquartered in Paris. The house produces both haute couture-inspired artisanal collections and ready-to-wear collections, with the former influencing the designs of the latter. Product lines include womenswear, menswear, fine jewelry, footwear, objects, fragrance, and home goods, among others. Known for deconstructive and avant-garde designs with unconventional materials, Maison Margiela has traditionally held live shows in unusual settings, for example empty metro stations and street corners. Models' faces are often obscured by fabric or long hair to direct attention to the clothes and design. Margiela resigned as creative designer in 2009 and John Galliano was appointed to the role in 2014.

History

Formation and early years
Maison Margiela was founded by Martin Margiela, a Belgian fashion designer, in 1988. Earlier, Margiela had studied fashion at the Royal Academy of Antwerp, and although he actually graduated a year earlier, in 1979, he is often mistaken for a member of the university's Avant-garde fashion collective the Antwerp Six. Among other influences, during the 1980s Margiela and other Belgian designers such as the Antwerp Six were inspired by deconstructive fashions introduced by Japanese avantgardists such as Rei Kawakubo—creator of the label Comme des Garçons. Margiela began utilizing the deconstructive style in the 1980s while a freelance designer in Milan, Italy, and early on his work would often reveal the garments’ structure, for example intentionally exposed linings and seams. In 1984 he became Jean Paul Gaultier’s design assistant in Paris, a role he held until 1987.

In 1988, Martin launched his own self-titled design label Maison Martin Margiela with business partner and fellow designer Jenny Meirens. Initially working out of a Paris apartment, they opened their first store in an unmarked white space in Paris, also opening a small studio on 12 Leopoldstraat in Antwerp. New York Magazine wrote that "the designer quickly defined a deconstructed look [with his new label]… Vaguely Dadaist, as if Marcel Duchamp were reincarnated as a fashion designer, Margiela questioned every tenet of fashion and luxury." Vogue would later write that his early ideas "provoked shock and intrigue" in the fashion industry. On the label's garments, simple blank white labels with four white tacks were sewn to signify the brand. Distinct product ranges were given numbers as signifiers, in no particular chronological order.

Early shows and anonymity

With New York Magazine describing the label's early shows as "perhaps more like art happenings than the thematic and operatic productions ‘80s Paris fashion is known for," in 1988, Maison Martin Margiela presented its debut womenswear collection in Paris. for the spring of 1989. Refusing to take bows at his live shows, Margiela began avoiding pictures and began handling all media via fax, with interviews taken collectively by the entire design team and correspondence signed with "we." Many in the fashion media contended that the anonymity was a publicity stunt,  although Maison Martin Margiela asserted that Margiela's anonymity was a reaction to an overly commercialized fashion industry and a genuine attempt to return the focus of fashion to the clothing, and not the personas behind it. The press dubbed Margiela the Greta Garbo of fashion as a result, a reference to Garbo's similar avoidance of the spotlight, and in 2008 the New York Times called Margiela "fashion's invisible man."

Purchase by OTB

In 1994 the New York Times commented on the company's influence by writing that its "made-over flea-market clothes put an end to the conspicuous consumption [of the fashion industry] of the 1980s." That year Maison Martin Margiela debuted its first period pieces. In 1998, Maison Martin Margiela debuted a menswear collection, known as line 10. Maison Martin Margiela oversaw creative direction of womenswear for the French design house Hermès from 1997 until 2003, with the design team working under Hermès chairman Jean-Louis Dumas. After going public in 2002, the majority of Maison Martin Margiela's shares were purchased by the OTB Group, a holding company led by Renzo Rosso, also owner of the Italian fashion label Diesel. In December 2004, Maison Martin Margiela moved into a new headquarters in an eighteenth-century convent in Paris' 11th arrondissement. The interior of the headquarters and furniture were painted entirely white with emulsion, creating an aged look. In addition to the white surroundings, employees all wear "blouse blanche", white coats traditionally worn by couture craftsmen. The white coats are both a nod to history and aesthetics, as well as an equalizer, as all employees wear them, regardless of title. By the summer of 2008 there were 14 Margiela boutiques.

New design team and collections
In October 2009, it was announced that Martin Margiela had resigned as creative director of Maison Martin Margiela, to varied speculation about the reasons. Following Margiela's departure, the anonymous design team continued to design the label, with no single creative director in place. CEO Giovanni Pungetti stated that "we want to stay avant-garde, and provocative, but without a new creative director. It’s a challenge. We know this. We will probably make mistakes, but the most important thing is to learn from them." The company expanded its homewares and interior design business in 2010, and in July 2011 the house designed several concept hotel suites for La Maison Champs-Élysées in Paris.

By the fall of 2014, sources estimated that the brand generated about $126 million in annual revenues, with around 50 directly owned stores. In October 2014 it was announced that John Galliano would take the position of creative director, after having previously served in that position at Givenchy, Dior, and his eponymous line, John Galliano. As reported by the Guardian, Margiela's only directions to the new director were "make it your own." Giving rare interviews in the interim, Galliano presented his debut collection for Maison Margiela in January 2015, to broadly positive reviews. Coinciding with Galliano's debut collection, it was revealed that the house had dropped "Martin" from its name, in favor of "Maison Margiela." A spokesperson for Maison Margiela said that the name change "represented an evolution of the house." With Galliano focusing on the haute couture element of the company, by the end of 2015 revenues were up 30%.

Stores

Prior to the brand's acquisition by OTB Group in 2002, its stores were not listed in the phone directory, and Margiela's name did not appear outside the shops. By the summer of 2008 there were 14 Margiela boutiques operating internationally, with expansion in Dubai, Hong Kong, Moscow and Munich taking place over the subsequent six months. In late 2009 the brand opened a "pop-up store" at the Art Basel Miami Beach art fair. The number of standalone stores had grown to 17 by 2010, with 21 "shop-in-shops" internationally. As of 2017, Maison Margiela has stores in countries such as France, the United Kingdom, Belgium, China, Germany, Hong Kong, Italy, Japan, South Korea, Taiwan, the United States, and Thailand.

Products 
Maison Margiela assigns each of its product ranges a number from 0 to 23 as a reference code, with no particular chronological order. Examples include fine jewelry (12), footwear (22), eyewear (8), objects (13) and fragrance (3). The house produces both artisanal collections and ready-to-wear collections, with the former inspiring the designs of the latter. With formal allegiance to no particular fashion movement,  Maison Margiela's designs are famous for deconstructionist traits such as exposed seams, being oversized and upcycling garments. Other deconstructionist tactics Maison Margiela has utilized include using traditional fabric linings as the outer layers of garments, and the label's 1988 debut womenswear collection included what The Independent described as "a leather butcher's apron reworked into a seductive evening gown," and an old tulle dress worked into several tailored jackets. Other work with unconventional materials has included clothes fashioned of plastic carrier bags and wire coat hangers, trouser suits made from 1970s upholstery fabrics, tops made with leather gloves, and jewelry made of colored ice such that clothes are dyed as the jewelry melts.

First shown in 1989 and introduced in 1992, one of the company's more recognized pieces is the Tabi boot, an interpretation of the traditional split Japanese tabi sock which separates the large toe. In 1994 Maison Margiela debuted its first period pieces, with a line of "complete reproductions," after building its previous collection entirely from its archives. Maison Margiela debuted a menswear collection in 1998, known as line 10.

Martin Margiela was creative director for womenswear of the French design house Hermès from 1997 until 2003, with the Maison Martin Margiela team's designs for Hermès unveiled twice a year in Hermes’ rue St-Honoré store. The Independent called the collections "understated," with both "loose-fitting masculine tailoring" and "black crêpe evening dresses," among other items.  New York MAgazine in turn described the designs as "quiet explorations of luxury that focused on classic clothes with subtle but masterful twists." Maison Martin Margiela debuted its first haute couture collection in 2006. In November 2008 the brand launched a small jewelry and eyewear collection including its first pair of sunglasses, described as "an impenetrable black band that wraps right around the face." The house's first fragrance was created in collaboration with L’Oreal, debuting in 2009. Maison Margiela debuted a capsule collection for H&M in 2012, consisting largely of reissued pieces from the Margiela archives. The company collaborated with Converse on shoe designs in 2013, and has also worked with the watch brand G-Shock and collaborated with Swarovski on ready-to-wear jewelry in 2013.

On 26 September 2018, after the spring/summer 2019 show, Maison Margiela's new fragrance, Mutiny was launched. Nose Dominique Ropion took six years to come up with a fragrance that reflects Galliano's vision of the Maison Margiela women. Willow Smith, Teddy Quinlivan, Hanne Gaby Odiele, Sasha Lane, Princess Nokia and Molly Bair are the chosen “Mutinist” ambassadors, who will be representing the diversity and individuality of the fragrance.

Live shows

Maison Margiela is known for showcasing collections in atypical settings and manners, with The New York Times describing the shows as "alternately electrifying or humorous or sexy or just plain weird." According to New York Magazine, early shows were "perhaps more like art happenings than the thematic and operatic productions ‘80s Paris fashion is known for," as well as "radically personal and humanistic expressions about clothes [at a time] when fashion otherwise seemed estranged from everyday realities." Maison Margiela's runway shows are notable in that the models' faces are often obscured by hoods,  fabric or long hair, in an attempt to direct attention to the clothes and away from the models themselves. In 1989 Maison Margiela staged a collection on a playground in the outskirts of Paris. With local children interacting with the models in an unrehearsed way and a first-come, first-served seating arrangement, according to Business of Fashion, "the critics loathed it. The industry loved it." Continuing to stage catwalks in unusual places, in spring 1992 a show in an abandoned Paris metro station featured models walking down staircases lined with candles, and according to The Independent, other settings have included round dining tables arranged in neglected warehouses, stairwells of old town houses, and disused subway cars.

Although the house has a reputation for avoiding booking celebrity models, for spring of 1993 models such as Cecilia Chancellor and Kate Moss showcased "minimalism paired with Victoriana." 1993 also saw a show with models weaving among a brass band on the runway, and in 1994 the label staged a collection based on what Barbie’s wardrobe would look like full size. Models sat amongst the audience in 1995, and on another occasion, in 1997 the company used a map to invite the fashion press to a street corner in France, and then had the models and a Belgian brass band showcase the newest collection after disembarking from an AEC Routemaster bus. Vogue also related that "one show challenged editors and buyers to seat themselves according to their perceived importance, while another saw models wheeled out on trolleys." According to Vogue, for two seasons in 1998 the label made do without live models, in one case instead using marionettes by Jane How.

Maison Martin Margiela was invited to show their first haute couture collection in Paris by The Chamber Syndicale in May 2006. The house then held its 20th anniversary show in September 2008 in Paris, featuring a catwalk with a walking birthday cake and "an oom-pah band surrounded by Margiela's lab-coated assistants." Clothing was described as "coats made of synthetic wigs, bodysuits that fused parts of trench coats and tuxedo jackets, and mirrored tights made to look like disco balls." The house designed Kanye West’s tour wardrobe in 2013 for his Yeezus tour.

The spring show of 2014 "melded sweet, pioneer styles like floral house dresses with edgier fare like nude bodysuits and oversize Willy Wonka sunglasses." In early 2015 the house premiered its first two collections with Galliano as head designer, initially the brand's "artisanal" collection. The second collection comprised 30 outfits including neon accessors, "Mary-Jane shoes and fake-fur slippers, short skirts, long coats, patent finishes." Galliano upheld house tradition by not taking a post-show bow, although he was in attendance at the shows. The July 2016 show by the house featured items such as military coats, a parachute dress, neon face paint, and 19th-century garments. In September 2016, Maison Margiela partnered with Barneys New York for its fall windows on Madison Avenue, creating four vignettes to reflect the house's recent artisans and ready-to-wear collections.

Retrospectives and exhibits
The Fashion Museum Province of Antwerp (MoMu) held a retrospective on the label's work in 2008, moving the exhibit to Somerset House in London two years later. In 2017, MoMu showcased the 12 collections the label had produced while Margiela was appointed by Jean-Louis Dumas to work with Hermès.

Documentaries 
In early 2015 filmmaker Alison Chernick released The Artist is Absent, a short biopic on Martin Margiela that launched at the Tribeca Film Festival. In November 2019, director Reiner Holzemer premiered the documentary 'Martin Margiela: In His Own Words'. Co-produced by Aminata and Holzemer (who had previously worked on a documentary by Dries Van Noten), it was called "the definitive study of this elusive, technically gifted designer " in Hollywood Reporter. He notably explained his withdrawal from the public eye and his desire to remain a designer, rather than "a creative director who directs his assistants". Typically, he is not shown on-screen.

See also
List of fashion designers#Belgium  
List of grands couturiers

References

External links

www.maisonmargiela.com

Clothing brands of Belgium
Clothing companies of France
Companies based in Paris
Companies established in 1980
Fashion accessory brands
High fashion brands
Luxury brands
Shoe companies of France
OTB Group